Strato Fighter, otherwise known as Raiga: Strato Fighter, is a 1991 video arcade game developed by Tecmo. It is a horizontally scrolling shooter in which two players may play simultaneously. The game sets players in the year 2135 on a mission to save the Earth from colony-based, militant alien invaders using the MB-OG Raiga (Thunder Fang).

Gameplay
The Raiga has the ability to spin around to attack enemies from behind. Power-ups can be obtained by destroying container ships. The craft's weapons include the Shotgun, Ion launcher, Vertical, Homing Missiles and Bomb attacks along with items such as Speed Ups, Shields and Extends. The spacecraft can also obtain an Option weapon called the Auto Guard; three types of Auto Guards were available such as the target locking Beam Rifle, the powerful Solid Shooter and the standard Blaster item.

In 2005, Strato Fighter was released on the Xbox, as part of the Tecmo Classic Arcade collection.

Reception 
In Japan, Game Machine listed Strato Fighter on their March 1, 1991 issue as being the third most-successful table arcade unit of the month.

References

External links

Strato Fighter at GameFAQs

1991 video games
Arcade video games
Horizontally scrolling shooters
Tecmo games
Video games developed in Japan
Xbox games